Brian Pilcher (born 22 November 1935) is  a former Australian rules footballer who played with Richmond in the Victorian Football League (VFL).

Notes

External links 
		

Living people
1935 births
Australian rules footballers from Victoria (Australia)
Richmond Football Club players